Richilde of Provence (c. 845 – 2 June 910, Kingdom of Lower Burgundy) was the second wife of the Frankish emperor Charles the Bald. By her marriage, she became queen and later empress. She ruled as regent in 877.

Life
Richilde was the daughter of Bivin of Gorze, Count of the Ardennes, and the sister of Boso of Provence (of the Bosonid dynasty). Her aunt was Theutberga, the wife of Lothar II of Lotharingia. Her marriage to Charles the Bald, in 870 after the death of his first wife, Ermentrude of Orléans, was intended to secure his rule in Lotharingia through her powerful family and her connection to Theutberga, the previous queen. Richilde bore Charles five children, but only the eldest daughter, Rothilde, survived to adulthood.

Whenever Charles went to war, Richilde managed the realm. She ruled as regent after the death of Charles in 877. Louis the Stammerer (son of Charles the Bald and Ermentrude of Orléans) died on 10 April 879, while his children were too young to rule on their own. Richilde planned to place her brother Boso on the throne. However, she was accused of incest with her brother and the lords of the kingdom refused to subject themselves to her authority. She then helped Boso to become the king of Provence.

Richilde attempted to assume a position of authority upon the death of Louis III in 882, and of Carloman II in 884; however, the empire was agitated and under threat by the Normans, and the grandees of the realm forced her to withdraw to Provence, then the realm of her nephew Louis the Blind, where she died on 2 June 910.

References

|-

840s births
910 deaths
Year of birth uncertain
Bosonids
Frankish queens consort
Queens consort of Lower Burgundy
9th-century women rulers
Carolingian dynasty
Women from the Carolingian Empire